Caroline Anderson may refer to:

 Caroline Anderson (writer), British novelist
 Caroline Still Anderson (1848–1919), American doctor
Caroline Anderson (New Zealand writer), contributor to 2016 comics anthology Three Words